Saxon is an unincorporated community in Raleigh County, West Virginia, United States. Saxon had a post office, which closed on June 27, 2009.

References

Unincorporated communities in Raleigh County, West Virginia
Unincorporated communities in West Virginia